Timothy Patrick Kelleher (17 March 1932 – 5 May 2008) was an Irish Gaelic footballer who played for club side Millstreet and at inter-county level with the Cork senior football team. He usually lined out at forward.

Career

Kelleher first played Gaelic football at juvenile and underage levels with Millstreet, before eventually joining the club's top adult team. He was a County Championship runner-up in 1956. Kelleher first appeared on the inter-county scene as a member of the Cork minor football team in 1950. Kelleher immediately progressed onto the Cork junior team and was right wing-forward on the All-Ireland-winning team in 1951. He later spent one season with the Cork senior football team.

Personal life and death

Kelleher emigrated to New York City in 1959, where he later met and married his wife Kathleen (née Lafferty). He later settled in Norwood, Massachusetts and was a longt-ime executive at White Rock Products, Inc. until his retirement in 1990. Kelleher died on 5 May 2008, aged 76.

Honours

Cork
All-Ireland Junior Football Championship: 1951
Munster Junior Football Championship: 1951

References

1932 births
2008 deaths
Millstreet Gaelic footballers
Cork inter-county Gaelic footballers